Honor Maria Ford-Smith (born 1951 in Montreal, Quebec) is a Jamaican actress, playwright, scholar, and poet. The daughter of a brown Jamaican mother and an English father, Ford-Smith is sometimes described as "Jamaica white," signalling a person of mixed race who appears white.

Ford-Smith, who studied theatre at the University of Wisconsin–Madison, was a co-founder and artistic director of Sistren, a theatre collective of working-class Jamaican women established in 1977. Sistren created its own plays collaboratively, and performed in Jamaica and abroad; the group also worked extensively in community theatre and popular education, particularly around issues affecting women. Sistren played a leading role in the Caribbean women's movement, providing feminist analysis of women's issues in Jamaica and entering into transnational alliances with women's organizations in the Caribbean region, North America, the UK, and Europe. Ford-Smith was also a member of the Groundwork Theatre Company, created in 1980 as the repertory arm of the Jamaica School of Drama; it became an autonomous company in 1987.

She edited and contributed to Sistren's book Lionheart Gal: Life Stories of Jamaican Women, published in 1986 and re-issued, with a new afterword by Ford-Smith, in 2005. Her collection of poems, My Mother's Last Dance, appeared in 1996. Among her many theatre projects have been a dramatic adaptation of My Mother's Last Dance, and Just Jazz, an adaptation of Jean Rhys's 1962 short story "Let Them Call It Jazz". Ford-Smith is a founding mother of the Caribbean Association for Feminist Research and Action (CAFRA).

Ford-Smith moved to Toronto in 1991, receiving her doctorate in education from the University of Toronto in 2004. She continues to write, to work in theatre and to teach in Toronto.

She teaches at York University in Toronto under the Faculty of Environmental & Urban Change.

References

1951 births
Actresses from Montreal
Canadian people of Jamaican descent
Jamaican stage actresses
Jamaican dramatists and playwrights
 University of Wisconsin–Madison College of Letters and Science alumni
Canadian women dramatists and playwrights
Canadian women poets
Canadian stage actresses
Living people
Writers from Montreal
Academic staff of York University
University of Toronto alumni
20th-century Canadian dramatists and playwrights
20th-century Canadian poets
20th-century Canadian women writers
20th-century Jamaican poets
Jamaican women poets